Daniel Lopez Cruz (born 12 January 1982) is a Brazilian footballer who most recently played for Gabala as a defender. Previously he has played for Naval.

Career statistics

References

External links

Living people
1982 births
Brazilian footballers
Gabala FC players
Expatriate footballers in Poland
Expatriate footballers in Azerbaijan
Association football defenders
Sportspeople from Salvador, Bahia